Michael Alexander Lynche (born May 31, 1983) is an American R&B singer and songwriter who was the fourth place finalist on the ninth season of American Idol and the second finalist on the series ever to receive the judges' save, which had been introduced in the prior season. Lynche went on to release a self-titled debut album in 2012. The lead single from that album, "Who's Gonna Love You More", reached the top twenty-five on Billboards Adult R&B chart. Since the release of his album, he has formed a live touring group, Michael Lynche and the Black Saints.

Early life
Lynche was born to Michele and Marque Lynche, Sr. His older brother Marque, Jr., a former mouseketeer on the All-New Mickey Mouse Club from 1993 to 1995, and semi-finalist on the third season of American Idol, died on December 6, 2015. His musical influences are Lauryn Hill, Maxwell and Al Green.

Before Idol, Lynche was a football player at Gibbs High School and the University of Central Florida. He played two seasons at University of Central Florida and later dropped out in 2003 to take care of his ailing mother. His mother died the following year of pancreatic cancer.

American Idol
Lynche auditioned in Orlando, Florida on July 9, 2009. He sang Unchained Melody by Alex North to all four judges, including guest judge Kristin Chenoweth.

During Hollywood Week, Lynche received news via telephone that his wife, Christa, had gone into labor and given birth to his daughter Laila Rose.  A week after Hollywood Week taping ended, his father revealed to a local newspaper that his son had made it into American Idol's Top 24, thus violating a confidentiality agreement with the show. Fox declined to comment on the report.

Since Lynche was among the top 10 finalists, he was part of the American Idol 2010 summer tour.

On April 7, 2010, Lynche was the lowest vote-getter and would have been eliminated from the competition, but the judges used their only save on him.

Lynche was eliminated from the competition on May 12, 2010, thus finishing in fourth place.

Performances

 Lynche received the lowest number of votes; however, the judges decided to use their one save for the season to allow him to remain in the competition, resulting in two eliminations the following week.
 Due to the judges using their one save to save Lynche, the Top 9 remained intact for another week.
 Lynche was saved first from elimination.
 When Ryan Seacrest announced the results in the particular night, Lynche was in the bottom two but declared safe when Aaron Kelly was eliminated.

Post Idol
Lynche joined the rest of the Top 10 on the American Idol LIVE! tour. His 3-song set included "This Woman's Work" by Kate Bush, "Ready for Love" by India.Arie, and "My Love" by Justin Timberlake. He also appeared alongside Casey James to perform their duet, "Have You Ever Really Loved a Woman" by Bryan Adams during James' set. He signed to Big3 Records and released two singles from his self-titled debut album: "Who's Gonna Love You More" and "Today". The former peaked at No. 25 on Billboards Adult R&B chart and at No. 84 on Billboards Hot R&B/Hip-Hop chart. The latter reached No. 39 on Mediabase's Adult Contemporary chart.

Lynche went on a diet and lost ninety pounds, while recording his debut album. Since the release of his album, he has performed live shows as lead singer of the group Michael Lynche and the Black Saints. He has also collaborated with conductor Jeff Tyzik on live orchestra shows. In December 2015, The Oakland Press reported that Lynche was in the process of developing a second album. An original song, "There Will Be Love", which was written for that album, has been performed by Lynche during his concerts and TV appearances.

Discography

Albums

EPs

Singles

References

External links
Official website
Michael Lynche at American Idol
Player Bio: Michael Lynche at UCF Athletics website

1983 births
Living people
20th-century African-American male singers
American Idol participants
Singers from Florida
Musicians from St. Petersburg, Florida
University of Central Florida alumni
21st-century American singers
21st-century American male singers
21st-century African-American male singers